Rogaland County Municipality is the democratically elected regional governing administration of Rogaland county, Norway. The responsibilities of the county municipality include the running of 29 upper secondary schools as well as managing the county roadways, public transport, dental care, cultural affairs, and cultural heritage.  The county municipality also coordinates regional planning and economic development.  The Rogfast is a major road project that is being financed by the county municipality. The administration is located in the city of Stavanger.

County government
The Rogaland county council is made up of 47 representatives that are elected every four years. The council essentially acts as a Parliament or legislative body for the county and it meets about six times each year. The council is divided into standing committees and an executive board which meet considerably more often. Both the council and executive board are led by the County Mayor.

County council
The party breakdown of the council is as follows:

References

 
Rogaland
County municipalities of Norway
1838 establishments in Norway